Sri Permaisuri is a township in Cheras, Kuala Lumpur, Malaysia. It is located near Bandar Tun Razak and Salak South. It was opened for residential housing in 2000. The major types of housing there are apartments and condominiums.

History
Bandar Sri Permaisuri is a privatised joint venture between Dwitasik Sdn. Bhd as the developer and Kuala Lumpur City Hall (Dewan Bandaraya Kuala Lumpur) (DBKL) as the land owner on a  site. It is developed as an integrated, self-contained residential, commercial and recreational township. The township was expected to cater to an estimated 70,000 people.

The development shares common boundaries with Cheras, Salak Selatan and Bandar Tun Razak. The area is also easily accessible via East–West Link Expressway, Kuala Lumpur–Seremban Expressway, Maju Expressway and Middle Ring Road II (MRRII). The township is divided 17 parcels; 10 residential and seven commercial parcels.

Location
Sri Permaisuri is located in the south of Kuala Lumpur. It is surrounded by Taman Ikan Emas (north), Salak Selatan New Village (south-east), Taman Mulia (south) and Salak Selatan town (west).

Facilities

Mosque
Masjid Al Najihin – opened in 2009 with a capacity of 5,000 people.

Temple
Cheras Kum Yum Tong (观音堂)

Educational Institutions
Few educational institutions are located at or within the vicinity of Sri Permaisuri. They are;
Sekolah Menengah Sains Selangor
SM Teknik Kuala Lumpur
Institut Perguruan Teknik 
Institut Perguruan Guru Kampus Ilmu Khas
SK Seri Tasik
SMK Seri Tasik
SMK Seri Permaisuri
Eye Level Learning Centre Bandar Sri Permaisuri
SMA Majlis Agama Islam Wilayah Persekutuan [SMA-MAIWP]
Sekolah Menengah Integrasi Sains Tahfiz [SMISTA-MAIWP]
First Note Music Studio

Sports and Recreational
Permaisuri Lake Gardens is one of the major attractions for jogger/runners from around Sri Permaisuri. The 40 ha garden features a lake, fountains and outdoor gyms. Also located by the lake is the Kuala Lumpur Football Association Stadium.

Health
Pusat Perubatan Universiti Kebangsaan Malaysia and Rehabilitation Hospital are located nearby on Jalan Yaacob Latif.

Shopping
A  mall; Queensville is being constructed in the township by Seal Inc Bhd. The mall is part of the development that includes serviced residences, flexible suites, an office tower and shoplots.

Connectivity

LRT 
Sri Permaisuri is well connected to the RapidKL LRT via  Salak Selatan LRT station (planned future interchange with MRT Circle Line), Salak Selatan KTM Komuter station as well as to the Sungai Besi Expressway (BESRAYA), Kuala Lumpur-Putrajaya Highway and the East–West Link Expressway.

MRT 
The district is planned to be served by the  Sri Permaisuri MRT station in the future which will be part of the proposed MRT Circle Line.

References
.

External links
 Bandar Sri Permaisuri

Suburbs in Kuala Lumpur